Rittika Sen is an Indian actress who appears in Bengali and Tamil films. She was featured in the Calcutta Times list of Most Desirable Women 2015.

Career 
Rittika Sen kicked off the journey in the showbiz industry in 2012 with the movie 100% Love.  In the movie, she appeared as a child actress with Jeet and Koel Mallick. In the same year, Rittika appeared in the movie Challenge 2 with Dev and Pooja Bose. She starred in the mainstream role in the movie Borbaad directed by Raj Chakraborty in 2014.  In the same year, Rittika acted in the movie Masoom.

Filmography

All Films are in Bengali, the language is otherwise noted.

Awards and Television
In 2016, she was awarded the Tele Cine Award for the Rising Star Cinema for the film “Arshinagar” 
Bou Kotha Kao as Mili (later replaced by Darshana Banik) (2009)
Beder Meye Jyostna as Queen of fairy (2019)

References

External links 

Living people
Indian film actresses
Actresses from Kolkata
Place of birth missing (living people)
21st-century Indian actresses
Female models from Kolkata
1998 births